J. P. Taravella High School is a secondary school located in Coral Springs, Florida which teaches grades 9–12. The school is a part of the Broward County Public Schools district. The school was named after Joseph Phillip Taravella (1919–1978), who was the president and chairman of Coral Ridge Properties, Inc., a subsidiary of Westinghouse Electric Corporation, and a founder of the City of Coral Springs.

Recognition
Taravella is ranked as a public high school 148th in the State of Florida and 2022nd nationally. There is an Accelerated Program pass rate of 51% at the school. It was the recipient of the National Blue Ribbon Schools Program Blue Ribbon School of Excellence Award in 1987.

It had a Florida Comprehensive Assessment Test school grade of "A" for the 2011–2012 academic year.

In 2018, the school received a "C" grade by Broward County.

In 2007, Taravella won the Grand Championship and also swept all awards at the Vero Beach Crown Jewel Marching competition.

In 2008, the J.P. Taravella Marching Band was selected by the Presidential Inaugural Committee as one of two bands (the other being Florida A&M) to represent Florida in the 2009 Presidential Inaugural Parade on January 20, 2009 in Washington, DC.

In 2014, the J.P. Taravella Drama Club was selected to perform in the Florida State Thespian Festival Mainstage for their musical Ragtime

In 2016, the J.P. Taravella Newspaper, known as the JPT Chariot was selected by the Florida Scholastic Press Association for their renowned online website and print newspaper. The JPT Chariot took the Silver Prize (Second) for 'FSPA 2015-16 Newspaper Evaluations' in Florida.

In 2017, JP Taravella's ACE Mentoring team, won first place in the county ACE competition.

Taravella has a very active vocal music department which has received many accolades both within Broward County and throughout the state of Florida.

J.P. Taravella Marching Band was selected by the Presidential Inaugural Committee to represent Florida in the 2009 Presidential Inaugural Parade on January 20, 2009 in Washington, DC.

J.P. Taravella Marching Band finished 10th in Bands of America in 2018 Regional Competition in Orlando and competed in Regional Finals.

The school was renowned for its competitive Speech and Debate team, previously coached by Beth Goldman, whose members garnered numerous accolades—both locally and nationally. At the 2009 NFL National Tournament in Birmingham, Alabama, all three Taravella national qualifiers finished in the top six. Captain John Mern finished sixth in the nation in United States Extemporaneous Speaking, and Debate Co-Captains Mickael Silangil and Brian Zakarin finished fourth in the nation in Public Forum Debate. John Mern also finished 1st in the state tournament in United States Extemporaneous speaking. In Goldman's final year, captain Rohit Bhandari placed 6th at the University of Pennsylvania National Invitational and 3rd place at the state tournament in United States Extemporaneous speaking. Goldman has now left and has been replaced by Jon Price.

Demographics
As of the 2021-22 school year, the total student enrollment is 2,752. The ethnic makeup of the school is 47.9% White, 43% Black, 32.4% Hispanic, 3.3% Asian, 0.3% Pacific Islander, 4.5% Multiracial, and 0.9% Native American or Native Alaskan. 59.9% of the student body is on the free-and-reduced lunch program.

Activities

Drama club
The Taravella Drama Club has won several accolades during its 25-year teachings by Ms. Lori Sessions. Locally, the club has locally won awards for acting and technical work for district competition. The Drama Club has won several "Cappie" Awards for its talented critics, tech crew, and acting as well. They have also been selected to perform at the state festival for their shows like Ragtime, Beauty and the Beast; along with several one act plays that have recently been directed by Mr. Daniel Bonnett

Academy of Finance
The Academy of Finance (AOF) connects high school students with the world of financial services, offering a curriculum that covers banking and credit, financial planning, securities, insurance, accounting, taxes and economics.  Students will participate in a variety of experiences to enhance classroom learning, including work-based learning activities, field trips, guest speakers, and cooperative learning projects.

DECA
The school is a member of DECA. Students are involved in chapter community service projects, and compete at the district, state, and international levels of marketing competition.

National Honor Society
J.P. Taravella has a chapter for students in The National Honor Society.

Newspaper - JPT Chariot
J.P. Taravella's newspaper, known as the JPT Chariot, was selected by the Florida Scholastic Press Association in 2016 for its online website and print newspaper. The JPT Chariot took the Silver Prize (Second) for 'FSPA 2015-16 Newspaper Evaluations' in Florida.

JPTV
“JPTV Live” hit the airwaves at J.P. Taravella High School on May 25, 1990 with segments on club activities, sports, and world news. JPTV Live received third place award for On-the-Spot Broadcasting Category at the Florida Scholastic Press Association (FSPA) Convention in 1990.

SECME/Engineering
J.P. Taravella has a renowned Engineering program. The program lasts 4 years in which students receive industry certifications, hands-on experience, and get to compete in International competitions. The program also offers a club to offer more experience and learning. This program is led by Matthew Gross and Steven Boyd.

ACE Mentoring
The ACE Mentoring program is an optional step into the field of Architecture, Construction, and Engineering. J.P. Taravella's ACE program is the largest in the county.

In 2017, JP Taravella's ACE Mentoring team, won first place in the county ACE competition.  The team was mentored by Current Builders and Thornton Tomasetti.

The team developed a design for the proposed Miami MLS stadium.

Early childhood program
Students in level 1 learn the basics of being a child caregiver. And then when they move on to levels 2,3, & 4 they're making lesson plans for the childcare center at the school called Little Trojans Academy.

Notable alumni

 Nevelle Clarke, professional football player for the New Orleans Breakers
 Darwin Espinal (Class of 2013), professional soccer player for the Tampa Bay Rowdies
 Matt Ford (Class of 1999), former major league baseball player
 Chad Gilbert, lead guitarist and composer for the Pop Punk band New Found Glory
 Jonathan Lovitz (Class of 2002, 2001 Miami Herald Silver Knight Award Winner), Advocate, politician, political commentator 
 Yael Markovich, Israeli/American Model and Beauty Queen/Pageant Titleholder (Miss Israel)
 John J. Miller (Class of 1988), National political reporter
 Dan Morgan (Class of 1997), former NFL football player
 Scott Putesky (Class of 1986), aka Daisy Berkowitz, musician
 Alberto Ruiz, goalkeeper for FC SCHÜTTORF 09
 Ben Saunders (fighter), professional Mixed Martial Artist
 Todd Weiner, former NFL football player
 Jeordie White (Class of 1989), aka Twiggy Ramirez, bassist
 Robbie Widlansky, baseball player
 Todd Widom (Class of 2001), professional tennis player

Incidents

2015
During the 2014–15 school year two small fires, two fights and the arrest of a student at J.P. Taravella High School prompted major concern.
Through the rest of the week there was a heavy police presence at the school.
The Broward School District said more officers than usual were at the school Wednesday "as an extra precaution and deterrent to potential disruptions," spokeswoman Nadine Drew said. "The school operated its normal schedule of classes and activities today, without incident."

2017
On March 6, 2017, a violent fight broke out between students in the school's parking lot behind the cafeteria. A video shows a female student being dragged across a parking lot  by her hair, then being beaten by the other student, who punches her and kicks her in the head.

During the week of May 14-May 20 during the 2016–2017 school year, the school received a series of gun threats and lock-downs.

2018
During the 2017–2018 school year, student Tyler Ahrens was arrested on Tuesday, April 4 for threatening to "shoot up" JP Taravella. Ahrens made posts on social media which read “I want to be a professional school shooter (no sarcasm, Broward County Florida) JP Taravella HS is my target tomorrow. I’M LEGIT NOT JOKING AROUND! SPREAD MY MESSAGE!!!!” and “For who ever is reading this, I will be shooting up my high school in Broward County FL. Tomorrow afternoon at 12:00 when school starts. Round 2.  JP Travels HS! (I am legit, make my presence known).” under the screen name "Sharp Shooter." This comes just two months after the deadly shooting at Taravella's sister school Marjory Stoneman Douglas High School. Ahrens pleaded not guilty on May 11, 2018, and remains on house arrest.

On October 2, 2018 during the 2018–2019 school year, JP Taravella's wrestling coach, Dustin Roy Garvin, was arrested for soliciting sexual acts with a minor online. The Florida Department of Law Enforcement conducted an undercover operation targeting J.P. Taravella High School assistant wrestling coach 32-year-old Dustin Roy Garvin on Aug. 30, 2017. Coral Springs Police, FBI and Broward Sheriff's Office officials took Garvin into custody at the school, Tuesday, after authorities said he had sexual conversations with an undercover agent who posed as the father of a 13-year-old boy. Officials said Garvin created a Craigslist ad under the username “Dirty Dusty” that solicited sexual favors from children. An undercover agent exchanged multiple conversations with Garvin in which, police said, he requested photos of the alleged boy. On October 3, 2018, Garvin was released on a $35,000 bond.

References

External links 
 
 JPT Chariot Schools Newspaper - JPT Chariot
 JPTV Taravella's TV Station 
 Drama Club Information Taravella Drama Troupe 3502 (Broken Link)
 J.P. Taravella Music Band Info
 Varsity and JV Football Information Varsity and JV Football Information

1981 establishments in Florida
Broward County Public Schools
Buildings and structures in Coral Springs, Florida
Educational institutions established in 1981
High schools in Broward County, Florida
Public high schools in Florida